Route 209 is a rural state highway in northwestern Connecticut, running from the Lakeside part of Morris to the borough of Bantam in the town of Litchfield.

Route description

Route 209 begins at an intersection with Route 109 east of the Lakeside section of Morris. It heads north along the west shore of Bantam Lake for  into the town of Litchfield. After crossing the Bantam River  later, it soon ends at an intersection with US 202 within the borough of Bantam. Route 209 is known as Bantam Lake Road for its entire length.

History
The road connecting the town of Morris with the borough of Bantam going alongside Bantam Lake was designated as a secondary state highway known as Highway 310 in 1922. In the 1932 state highway renumbering, old Highway 310 was renumbered to Route 109. In 1963, Route 109 was reconfigured such that it went west toward Washington instead. The former section of Route 109 along the west shore of Bantam Lake was renumbered to Route 209. The route has had no changes since.

Junction list

References

External links

209
Transportation in Litchfield County, Connecticut